Ochrus tippmanni is a species of beetle in the family Cerambycidae. It was described by Lane in 1956.

References

Hesperophanini
Beetles described in 1956